Fowler is a village in Clinton County in the U.S. state of Michigan.  The population was 1,226 at the 2020 census.  The village is located within Dallas Township.

History 
Originally called "Dallas", Fowler was created when Robert Highman, Chief Engineer of the Detroit, Grand Haven, and Milwaukee Railroad, and E.A Wales acquired a tract of land along the railroad right-of-way in 1857. The Detroit, Grand Haven, and Milwaukee railroad completed the rail line though the area in July and August of 1857. Dallas was later changed to Isabella and subsequently Fowler.
A few years after the founding of Dallas, the town had little economic growth and was subsequently moved to a tract of land 1/10 of a mile west of the original tract, owned by John N. Fowler and in 1869 the name was changed to "Fowler". The village was originally settled in a swampy area and the move was driven by the lack of economic growth. 
In 1885, the town was incorporated as a village in Clinton County, reportedly during a high growth lumber boom.

In 1905, massive flooding in the area washed out a culvert three and a half miles west of town. A Grand Trunk work train was sent to repair the culvert but plunged into the creek, killing five men. 

Fowler remains a small rural community, serving the needs of the local farming community and as a satellite community to Lansing.

Geography

The village is served by the 48835 ZIP Code.

Demographics

2010 census
As of the census of 2010, there were 1,208 people, 451 households, and 319 families living in the village. The racial makeup of the village was 98.1% White, 0.4% African American, 0.7% Asian, 0.2% from other races, and 0.6% from two or more races. Hispanic or Latino of any race were 2.5% of the population.

There were 451 households, of which 34.1% had children under the age of 18 living with them, 60.3% were married couples living together, 7.1% had a female householder with no husband present, 3.3% had a male householder with no wife present, and 29.3% were non-families. 24.2% of all households were made up of individuals, and 12.9% had someone living alone who was 65 years of age or older. The average household size was 2.68 and the average family size was 3.24.

The median age in the village was 36.1 years. 29.7% of residents were under the age of 18; 7.4% were between the ages of 18 and 24; 25.5% were from 25 to 44; 20% were from 45 to 64; and 17.3% were 65 years of age or older. The gender makeup of the village was 50.7% male and 49.3% female.

2000 census
As of the census of 2000, there were 1,136 people, 428 households, and 306 families living in the village. The racial makeup of the village was 100% White

There were 428 households, out of which 35.5% had children under the age of 18 living with them, 62.1% were married couples living together, 7.0% had a female householder with no husband present, and 28.3% were non-families. 23.8% of all households were made up of individuals, and 11.2% had someone living alone who was 65 years of age or older.  The average household size was 2.64 and the average family size was 3.19.

In the village, the population was spread out, with 27.9% under the age of 18, 9.9% from 18 to 24, 28.9% from 25 to 44, 17.7% from 45 to 64, and 15.7% who were 65 years of age or older.  The median age was 33 years. For every 100 females, there were 100.7 males.  For every 100 females age 18 and over, there were 94.5 males.

The median income for a household in the village was $42,171, and the median income for a family was $56,625. Males had a median income of $40,134 versus $25,804 for females. The per capita income for the village was $18,123.  About 2.7% of families and 4.0% of the population were below the poverty line, including 2.2% of those under age 18 and 6.7% of those age 65 or over.

Notable people
 Slicker Parks, baseball pitcher for University of Michigan and Detroit Tigers
 Todd Simon, head coach of Southern Utah University men's basketball team
 Clem Sohn, daredevil, aviation pioneer

References

External links
 Official website of the Village of Fowler

Villages in Clinton County, Michigan
Villages in Michigan
Lansing–East Lansing metropolitan area
Populated places established in 1867
1867 establishments in Michigan